NATO bombings include:

20th century
 1994 NATO bombing intervention in Bosnia and Herzegovina, part of Operation Deny Flight
 1995 NATO bombing intervention in Bosnia and Herzegovina, Operation Deliberate Force
 1999 NATO bombing of Yugoslavia as part of the Kosovo War
 1999 NATO bombing of Albanian refugees near Gjakova

21st century
 2007 Helmand Province airstrikes
 2010 NATO bombing of Tarok Kolache
 2011 military intervention in Libya
 Bab al-Azizia#2011 bombings, rebel capture, and demolition

NATO
Lists of wars